Living in Your Car is a Canadian television comedy-drama series that debuted on May 7, 2010 on HBO Canada.

The series stars John Ralston as Steve Unger, a former high-flying corporate executive struggling to rebuild his life after being indicted on fraud, obstruction and racketeering charges. Legally forbidden to hold any job dealing with other people's money, he finds himself ordered to teach a business ethics class — and is forced to live in his car when his wife won't let him back into their home.

The series was created and principally written by George F. Walker, Dani Romain, and Joseph Kay.

Cast
John Ralston as Steve Unger
Ingrid Kavelaars as Lori Unger, Steve's estranged wife
Mariah Horner as Kate Unger, Steve and Lori's daughter
Colin Cunningham as Neil Stiles, Steve's lawyer
Kathryn Winslow as Bridget
Ivo Canelas as Bruno
Lúcia Moniz as Carol
Clare Coulter as Jess Unger
Joe Cobden
Catherine Fitch

Episode list

Series overview

Season 1

Season 2
On June 14, 2010 Astral Media and Corus Entertainment announced a second season of Living in Your Car had been commissioned and would begin production in the summer of 2010 for broadcast in 2011.

Awards and nominations
The series received ten Gemini Award nominations at the 26th Gemini Awards in 2011.

References

External links

Official website (accessible only from Canada)

2010 Canadian television series debuts
2011 Canadian television series endings
Crave original programming
2010s Canadian comedy-drama television series
Works about punishment
Works about businesspeople
Works about poverty
Television episodes about homelessness
Homelessness in popular culture
Television episodes about crime
Works about criminals